Kerang Airport  is located  southeast of Kerang, Victoria, Australia.

See also
 List of airports in Victoria

References

Airports in Victoria (Australia)
Kerang, Victoria